Forest E. "Aggie" Sale (June 25, 1911 – December 4, 1985) was an American college basketball player at the University of Kentucky from 1930–31 to 1932–33. He played for coach Adolph Rupp and was one of Rupp's first NCAA All-Americans.

Sale attended Kavanaugh High School in Anderson County, Kentucky prior to matriculating at the University of Kentucky. As a  forward/center, he was a rather tall player for his era. Sale used his height to his advantage and was noted as both a good scorer and rebounder. In his three seasons with the Wildcats team, Sale played in 50 career games and scored 657 points. He was twice named a consensus All-American, and as a senior in 1932–33 Sale was selected as the Helms Athletic Foundation (HAF) National Player of the Year. That year, Kentucky won the Southeastern Conference regular season and SEC Tournament titles, finished with a 21–3 overall record, and were named the HAF National Champions.

After college, Sale became a high school history teacher and basketball coach before joining the United States Navy and fighting in World War II for a year. He returned to being a teacher and coach, and then from 1964 to 1967 he ran his own Sale Sporting Goods Store. He entered politics in 1971 as a Democrat and was elected to the Kentucky House of Representatives from the 55th District. Sale was re-elected four times before ending his political career.

Forest Sale died of a heart attack on December 4, 1985, at St. Joseph Hospital in Lexington, Kentucky.

See also
Honored Kentucky Wildcats men's basketball players

References

1911 births
1985 deaths
20th-century American politicians
All-American college men's basketball players
American men's basketball players
Basketball coaches from Kentucky
Basketball players from Kentucky
Centers (basketball)
Forwards (basketball)
High school basketball coaches in the United States
Kentucky Wildcats men's basketball players
Democratic Party members of the Kentucky House of Representatives
People from Anderson County, Kentucky
People from Mercer County, Kentucky
United States Navy personnel of World War II